Max Zahle is a German filmmaker. On 24 January 2012, he was nominated for an Academy Award for the film Raju.

References

External links

Living people
Year of birth missing (living people)